Hats Off to the Insane is a compilation mini-album by the Northern Irish rock band Therapy?. It was released in the United States and Japan on 7 September 1993 via A&M Records.

Background 
All tracks were previously released in Europe on different EPs. Tracks 1, 2 and 3 were originally featured on the Shortsharpshock EP, tracks 4, 5, 7 and 8 were featured on the Face the Strange EP, and track 6 originally featured on the Opal Mantra EP.

The mini-album was released on CD and cassette.

All tracks were included on disc 3 of the Troublegum deluxe edition released by Universal Music on 31 March 2014.

Track listing 
All songs written by Therapy?

Personnel 
Therapy?
Andy Cairns – vocals, guitar
Fyfe Ewing – vocals, drums
Michael McKeegan – bass
Technical
Chris Sheldon – producer, mixer
Therapy? - mixer
Sunja Park – design

Promo videos 
"Screamager": directed by Jon Klein
"Turn": directed by Julie Hermelin
"Opal Mantra": directed by Benjamin Stokes

Single 
"Screamager" was released in 1993 as a one track radio only promo in the US; the song reached number 16 on the Modern Rock Charts.

References 

Therapy? albums
1993 EPs
Albums produced by Chris Sheldon
1993 compilation albums
A&M Records compilation albums
A&M Records EPs